City Streets is a 1938 American melodrama set in New York City. Wheel-chair bound orphan Winnie Brady (Edith Fellows) is taken in by shopkeeper Joe Carmine (Leo Carrillo).  An unsuccessful operation on Winnie's legs bankrupts Carmine, who then sells fruit on the streets. Winnie is sent to live in an orphanage, and Carmine is discouraged from continuing his relationship with her. Carmine is so distraught by grief that he slowly begins to die. Winnie is brought to him by local priest Father Ryan (Frank Sheridan), and she finds the strength to stand and walk to his bedside, eventually regaining full use of her legs.

Cast
Leo Carrillo – Joe Carmine
Edith Fellows – Winnie Brady
Tommy Bond – Tommy Francis Devlin
Mary Gordon – Mrs. Devlin
Frank Sheridan – Father Ryan

References

External links
 
 
 
 

1938 films
1930s English-language films
1938 drama films
American black-and-white films
Films set in New York City
Columbia Pictures films
American drama films
Melodrama films
Films directed by Albert S. Rogell
1930s American films